Evelio Droz Ramos (born 10 May 1937) in San Juan, Puerto Rico is a Puerto Rican former basketball player who competed in the 1960 Summer Olympics and in the 1964 Summer Olympics.

References

1937 births
Living people
Puerto Rican men's basketball players
1959 FIBA World Championship players
1963 FIBA World Championship players
Olympic basketball players of Puerto Rico
Basketball players at the 1960 Summer Olympics
Basketball players at the 1964 Summer Olympics
Basketball players at the 1959 Pan American Games
Basketball players at the 1963 Pan American Games
Pan American Games medalists in basketball
Pan American Games silver medalists for Puerto Rico
Pan American Games bronze medalists for Puerto Rico
Medalists at the 1963 Pan American Games
20th-century Puerto Rican people